The 2017 GP3 Series was the eighth season of the third-tier of Formula One feeder championship and also eighth season under the moniker of GP3 Series, a motor racing feeder series that runs in support of the 2017 FIA Formula One World Championship and sister series Formula 2.

George Russell won the drivers' championship. In the teams' championship, defending champions ART Grand Prix secured their seventh GP3 Series title. Trident Racing were second ahead of Jenzer Motorsport.

Champion George Russell took 4 wins, Giuliano Alesi got 3 sprint race wins., Nirei Fukuzumi won 2 races during the season, and Dorian Boccolacci, Arjun Maini, Raoul Hyman, Jack Aitken, Alessio Lorandi, and Niko Kari all took 1 win each. ART Grand Prix won all feature races, except the last race, which was won by Arden International.

Teams and drivers
All GP3 drivers competed in a Dallara GP3/16 chassis, using a Mecachrome GP3 V6 engine and Pirelli P Zero and Cinturato tyres.

Driver changes
Changing teams
Renault Sport Academy member Jack Aitken switched from Arden International to ART Grand Prix.
Tatiana Calderón moved from Arden International to DAMS.
Kevin Jörg switched from DAMS to Trident.
Steijn Schothorst, who raced for Campos Racing switched to Arden International.

Joining GP3
Bruno Baptista, who raced in Eurocup Formula Renault 2.0 stepped up to GP3 Series with DAMS.
2016 Eurocup Formula Renault 2.0 runner-up Dorian Boccolacci joined the series with Trident.
Julien Falchero graduated from Eurocup Formula Renault 2.0, joining Campos Racing.
Red Bull Junior driver Niko Kari, who finished tenth in the 2016 European Formula 3 season and contested in the Spa round of the 2016 season with Koiranen GP, competing in the series full-time with Arden International.
2016 Euroformula Open Champion Leonardo Pulcini, graduated with Arden International.
Anthoine Hubert and Mercedes F1 junior driver George Russell, who finished eighth and third in the 2016 European Formula 3 season respectively, joined the series with ART Grand Prix.
2016 Italian F4 Champion Marcos Siebert moved to the series with Campos Racing.
European Formula 3 racers Ryan Tveter and Raoul Hyman joined the series with Trident and Campos Racing respectively.

Leaving GP3
Arden International driver Jake Dennis left the series after the 2016 season, to compete in Blancpain GT Series.
 2016 champion Charles Leclerc and Antonio Fuoco graduated to the FIA Formula 2 Championship with Prema Racing.
 DAMS driver Jake Hughes left the series to race in European Formula 3 with Hitech GP.
 Matevos Isaakyan, who raced with Koiranen GP concentrated on World Series Formula V8 3.5 campaign, joining AVF.
 Campos Racing drivers Álex Palou and Konstantin Tereshchenko left the series, to participate in All-Japan Formula Three Championship with ThreeBond Drago Corse and World Series Formula V8 3.5 with Teo Martín Motorsport respectively.

Midseason changes
 Matthieu Vaxivière joined DAMS from the Hungaroring round, replacing Santino Ferrucci, who was promoted to the 2017 FIA Formula 2 Championship with Trident.
 Juan Manuel Correa took seat in Jenzer Motorsport at Spa, making his GP3 Series debut.
 Red Bull Junior Dan Ticktum joined DAMS for the Monza round, replacing Vaxivière.

Team changes
 After having competed in the series since 2013, Koiranen GP left the series.

Calendar
On 27 January 2017, the full calendar was revealed with eight rounds taking place.

Calendar changes
 The series will make its début at the Circuito de Jerez, with a stand-alone event planned as the penultimate round of the season.
 The Hockenheim and Sepang round were removed from the calendar.

Race by Race

Round 1: Spain

Jack Aitken became the first polesitter of the 2017 season and Dorian Boccolacci qualified third on his first GP3 race.

Rule changes
The series will introduce the use of the drag reduction system (DRS), an overtaking aid that cancels out aerodynamic drag and allowing drivers to achieve a higher top speed when within one second of the car in front at designated points on the circuit. Further restrictions will be placed on the use of DRS, with drivers only able to use it a limited number of times in each race.

Results

Season summary

Championship standings

Scoring system
Points were awarded to the top 10 classified finishers in the race 1, and to the top 8 classified finishers in the race 2. The pole-sitter in the race 1 also received four points, and two points were given to the driver who set the fastest lap inside the top ten in both the race 1 and race 2. No extra points were awarded to the pole-sitter in the race 2.

Race 1 points

Race 2 points
Points were awarded to the top 8 classified finishers.

Drivers' championship

Notes:
† — Drivers did not finish the race, but were classified as they completed over 90% of the race distance.

Teams' championship
Only three best-finishing cars are allowed to score points in the championship.

Notes:
† — Drivers did not finish the race, but were classified as they completed over 90% of the race distance.

Footnotes

References

External links
 

GP3 Series
GP3 Series seasons
GP3
GP3 Series